Brittany Augustine (born September 19, 1991) is an American former professional tennis player.

Augustine was born in Orlando to Sydney and Carol Augustine, who are both originally from Trinidad and Tobago. She grew up in Carson, California.

In 2007 she made her only WTA Tour singles main-draw appearance as a wildcard at the Acura Classic in San Diego, where she lost to a 19-year old Angelique Kerber in the first round.

ITF finals

Doubles: 3 (1–2)

References

External links
 
 

1991 births
Living people
American female tennis players
Tennis people from California
American sportspeople of Trinidad and Tobago descent
People from Carson, California
21st-century American women